The Croatian Ice Hockey Federation is the governing body of ice hockey in Croatia.

The Croatian Ice Hockey Federation was established on November 9, 1935 in Zagreb. It has been a member of IIHF since May 7, 1992. It is based in Zagreb, Trg Krešimira Ćosića 11.

References

External links
Official Website
Croatia at IIHF.com

Ice hockey in Croatia
Ice hockey
Ice hockey governing bodies in Europe
International Ice Hockey Federation members
Sports organizations established in 1935